The 2003–04 Manhattan Jaspers basketball team represented Manhattan College during the 2003–04 NCAA Division I men's basketball season. The Jaspers, led by head coach Bobby Gonzalez, played their home games at Draddy Gymnasium and were members of the Metro Atlantic Athletic Conference. They finished the season 25–6, 16–2 in MAAC play to win the league regular season title. They were champions of the MAAC tournament to earn an automatic bid to the NCAA tournament. Playing as the No. 12 seed in the Atlanta region, Manhattan upset No. 5 seed Florida in the opening round before pushing No. 4 seed Wake Forest to the brink before falling, 84–80.

Roster

Schedule and results

|-
!colspan=9 style=| Regular season

|-
!colspan=9 style=| MAAC tournament

|-
!colspan=9 style=| NCAA tournament

References

Manhattan Jaspers basketball seasons
Manhattan
Manhattan
Manhattan Jaspers men's basketball
Manhattan Jaspers men's basketball